Kyi, Shchek and Khoryv were three legendary brothersoften mentioned along with their sister Lybidwho, according to the Primary Chronicle, founded the medieval city of Kyiv, which eventually  became the capital of Kievan Rus' and present-day Ukraine. There is no precise and historically established information about the rule of Kyi and the establishment of the city of Kyiv.

Historical background
In the Primary Chronicle, which is traditionally believed to have been written by a monk of Kyiv Cave Monastery by the name of Nestor and finished in 1113, a special place is held by the legend of the foundation of Kyiv by three brothers. Nestor places those brothers onto various hills of Kyiv. Geographically, the old Kyiv is located on a higher right bank of the Dnieper, which is an extension of the Dnieper Upland, where remnants of the Church of the Tithes are located.

The Chronicle further states that there were people ("who did not know what they were saying") who considered Kyi a mere ferryman. But it later claims that Kyi, as a prince of his gens, was visiting Czargrad and received great honors from the Emperor. Dmitry Likhachov combined attestations of the Nikon Chronicle, which also recounts that Kyi with a great army marched onto Czargrad and received great honors from the Emperor. During his expedition to Constantinople, Kyi also founded a city of Kyivets on the Danube.

Nestor also names the approximate date of the assault on Kyiv by the Khazar Empire as "after the death of Kyi," which supports Boris Rybakov's hypothesis of the 6th-7th centuries. In his chronicle Nestor does not indicate the date of Kyi's death nor the existence or absence of heirs who continued to rule after his death. The chronicle does mention a meeting between local residents with the newly arrived Askold and Dir who asked them whose city Kjiv was, and received the answer that the three brothers who built it were long dead and the residents now paid tribute to the Khazars. However, the Polish historian Jan Długosz points out the Przemysł Chronicle that asserts, "after the death of Kyi, Shchek and Khoryv, their children and grandchildren who descended from them by direct lineage ruled for many years."

Excerpt from the Ruthenian Primary Chronicles

Translation by Dmitry Likhachov

Translation by Samuel Hazzard Cross

Archaeological excavations

Archaeological excavations have shown that there was indeed an ancient settlement starting with the 6th century. Some speculate that Kyi was a real person, a knyaz (prince) from the tribe of the Polans. According to legend, Kyi, the eldest brother, was a Polianian Prince, and the city was named after him. In addition, the legend says that the appearance of a large city on the hilly banks of the Dnieper was predicted by Andrew the Apostle.

Historiographical interpretation
Many historians consider Kyi and his rule circa the 6th century to be actual history. Among such historians are Boris Rybakov, Dmitry Likhachov, Aleksey Shakhmatov, Alexander Presnyakov, Petro Tolochko, and Nataliia Polonska-Vasylenko.

The names of Kyi and his brothers have equivalents in an Armenian chronicle from the 7th century, History of Taron, by Zenob Glak. In it, Kyi and Khoryv have counterparts in brothers Kouar and Horian, while Polyans is paralleled in the Balounik district. The legend also has parallels in the Croatian origo gentis of five brothers and two sisters (Kloukas, Lobelos, Kosentzis, Mouchlo, Chrobatos, Touga and Bouga) from the 30th chapter of De Administrando Imperio by Constantine VII (10th century), and the Bulgarian apocryphal chronicle (12th century) about the ethnogenesis of the Bulgarians. All three speak about people who migrated to a foreign land, whose leader was of the same name (Kyi in Kyiv, Chrobatos in Croats, and Slav in Bulgarians), while Kyivan and Croatian mention a sister. The female personality and number three can be found also in three daughters (youngest Libuše) of Duke Krok from Chronica Boemorum (12 century), two sons and daughter (Krakus II, Lech II, and Princess Wanda) of Krakus legendary founder of Kraków from Chronica seu originale regum et principum Poloniae (12-13th century), and three brothers Lech, Czech, and Rus from Wielkopolska Chronicle (13th century).

Khoryv or Horiv, and his oronym Khorevytsia, some scholars related to the Croatian ethnonym of White Croats. Paščenko related his name, beside to the Croatian ethnonym, also to the solar deity Khors. Near Kyiv there is a stream where previously existed a large village named Horvatka or Hrovatka (it was destroyed in the time of Joseph Stalin), which flows into Stuhna River.

Modern tributes

In addition to the respective hills and the river, there are Shchekavytska and Khoryva Streets in Kyiv's ancient neighborhood of Podil.

In 1982, Kyi, Shchek, Khoryv and Lybid were depicted (standing on an ancient riverboat) in a sculpture at the river-side of Navodnytsky Park. The Monument to the Founders of Kyiv, created by Vasyl Borodai, soon became iconic for the city and has been used as Kyiv's unofficial emblem. In the 2000s another statue was installed at a fountain of the Maidan Nezalezhnosti.

See also
 Lech, Czech, and Rus
 Jonakr's sons

References

External links
 Основатели Кий, Щек и Хорив и их сестра Лыбедь, князья Аскольд и Дир 
 A HISTORY OF UKRAINE. EPISODE 14. THE FOUNDING OF KYIV
 Dmytro Lavrov. How many years has Kiev (СКІЛЬКИ РОКІВ МІСТУ КИЄВУ?). The Mirror Weekly. 28 May 2004
 Mykola Kotlyar. Kiev princes Kyi and Askold (КИЇВСЬКІ КНЯЗІ КИЙ І АСКОЛЬД). Magazine "Voyenna istoriya". 2002

6th-century Slavs
History of Kyiv
Slavic mythology
Origin myths
Mythological city founders
Sibling trios